Constantine II (Konstantine II) (died 1401), of the Bagrationi dynasty, was king of western Georgian kingdom of Imereti from 1396 until his death in 1401.

Constantine was born sometime after 1358 into the family of Bagrat I, then duke (and ex-king) of Imereti, and his wife, a Jaqeli noblewoman of Samtskhe. He was a younger brother of two successive kings of Imereti, Alexander I and George I, who had broken away from the Kingdom of Georgia during Timur's invasions of that country. After the death of George I in the battle with Vameq I Dadiani, Duke of Mingrelia, in 1392, Constantine and his nephew, Demetrius, son of Alexander, fled to the Caucasian mountains, while Imereti was reintegrated by George VII of Georgia.

In 1396, Constantine took advantage of George VII's continuous war with Timur—in which a great number of Imeretians died—and the death of Vameq Dadiani and returned to Imereti. He conquered a number of fortresses in the country and proclaimed himself king. Subsequently, he attempted to win over the dukes of Mingrelia and Guria, and the Svans, but he was killed in 1401. As Constantine was childless, the crown of Imereti was to be passed on to his young and weak nephew, Demetrius, but Imereti was reconquered by George VII of Georgia.

References 

Bagrationi dynasty of the Kingdom of Imereti
1401 deaths
Year of birth unknown
14th-century people from Georgia (country)
Kings of Imereti
15th-century people from Georgia (country)